Fallen Kingdom may refer to:

 Jurassic World: Fallen Kingdom, a 2018 American film
 Fallen Kingdom, a 2012 parody song of Viva La Vida by CaptainSparklez